Corus Hotels is a group of eight hotels based in the UK, with two hotels in Malaysia. The hotels are owned by London Vista Hotel Limited, which is part of Malayan United Industries. The brand name was launched in 1998 by the Regal Hotel Group, in order to differentiate it from Regal Hotels International.

Retirement of Elena Salvoni
In 2010, Corus Hotels found itself in the national newspapers for retiring maitre d' Elena Salvoni, on the same day that the Government announced plans to scrap the default retirement age. Ms Salvoni was 90 years old.

Training schemes
In 2003, Corus launched a chef training school, and later, a Reception School.

Hotels

United Kingdom
Corus Hotel Hyde Park, London
Burnham Beeches Hotel, Burnham, Buckinghamshire
The Iliffe Hotel, Coventry
The Hillcrest Hotel, Widnes
The Regency Hotel, Birmingham/Solihull
St. James' Hotel, Grimsby

Also operates
The Belsfield Hotel, Lake Windermere

Malaysia
Corus Hotel Kuala Lumpur, Kuala Lumpur
Corus Paradise Resort Port Dickson, Port Dickson

References

External links
 

Companies based in Milton Keynes
Hotel chains in the United Kingdom